Joseph Peter Burg (June 4, 1882 – April 28, 1969) was a third baseman in Major League Baseball. He played 13 games for the Boston Doves in 1910. Despite being above average in on-base percentage, Joseph Burg wouldn't play in Major League Baseball for the rest of his career.

After Burg's brief career in Major League Baseball, he played six more seasons in Minor League Baseball, until age thirty-four. He played Single A, Double-A, and in the New York State League. No complete record's of Burg's statistics from the New York State League's are available.

External links
 Career statistics and player information from FanGraphs

1882 births
1969 deaths
Major League Baseball third basemen
Boston Doves players
Springfield Senators players
Burlington Pathfinders players
Utica Utes players
Omaha Rourkes players
Baseball players from Chicago
Lake Linden Lakers players